Sugarmouse Island is an unpopulated islet located close to the south-western coast of Tasmania, Australia. Sugarmouse Island is part of the Southwest National Park and the Tasmanian Wilderness World Heritage Site.

Fauna
The island is part of the Port Davey Islands Important Bird Area, so identified by BirdLife International because of its importance for breeding seabirds. Recorded breeding seabird species are the fairy prion (2000 pairs) and black-faced cormorant.

See also

 List of islands of Tasmania

References

Islands of South West Tasmania
Important Bird Areas of Tasmania
Protected areas of Tasmania